A list of films produced by the Israeli film industry in 1970.

1970 releases

See also
1970 in Israel

References

External links
 Israeli films of 1970 at the Internet Movie Database

Lists of 1970 films by country or language
Film
1970